What the Future Holds is a Spanish period drama miniseries created by Mariano Barroso for Movistar+. The series is based on Ignacio Martínez de Pisón's novel of the same name and premiered on 22 June 2018. The screenplay was co-penned by Barroso and Alejandro Hernández.

Premise
Justo Gil, a restless and ambitious young man, arrives at the prosperous and promising city of 1960s Barcelona like another migrant worker, break even and with the aim of becoming a man of success. The city, which is turning into modernity, seems like the place to make it big: an oasis of freedom in the middle of the paramo of Francoism from 1966 to 1977.

Cast

Main

Recurring

Episodes

References

External links

El día de mañana (Miniserie de TV) on Filmaffinity

2010s Spanish drama television series
2018 Spanish television series debuts
Spanish-language television shows
Period television series
Television series about the history of Spain
Television shows set in Barcelona
Movistar+ network series
Television series set in the 1960s
Television series based on Spanish novels
Television series by MOD Producciones